Jun Matsumoto (born 1983) is a Japanese singer and actor.

Jun Matsumoto or Matsumoto Jun may also refer to:
 Jun Matsumoto (politician) (born 1950), Japanese politician and parliament member
 Matsumoto Jun (physician) (1832–1907), Japanese physician